The Arsk uprising was a Tatar peasant rebellion against the Soviet power in Kazan, Layesh, Mamadysh uyezds of Kazan Governorate. It started on October 25, 1918, against the prodrazvyorstka policy. On November 10 rebels took the town of Arsk. Red guards with cannons were sent to suppress the rebellion. On November 15 the rebellion was defeated, 31 rebels were killed, 11 wounded. The participants of the rebellion repaid a contribution to the Soviet power.

References

Anti-Bolshevik uprisings
History of Tatarstan
Rebellions in Russia
Peasant revolts
1918 in Russia
Conflicts in 1918
Rebellions in the Soviet Union